Jon Fogarty (born May 23, 1975 in Palo Alto, California) is an American racing driver, who competes in the United SportsCar Championship for GAINSCO/Bob Stallings Racing. He won the 2007 and 2009 GRAND-AM Rolex Sports Car Series Daytona Prototype drivers' championship and is a two-time Atlantic Championship champion as well.

Early racing career
Fogarty competed in the Barber Dodge Pro Series from 1996 until 2000, finishing series runner-up twice. Following a year where he was injured in Indy Lights in 2001, he moved into Toyota Atlantic in 2002 and edged Michael Valiante for the series championship. He was unsuccessful in a bid to find a Champ Car ride for 2003 and came back to earn his second Toyota Atlantic championship in 2004, with six wins to his credit.

American Le Mans Series
Following an unsuccessful search for a Champ Car ride, Fogarty moved into sports car racing, driving for Flying Lizard Motorsports in the American Le Mans Series in 2005, finishing third in the GT2 drivers' championship with Johannes van Overbeek. He made only a handful of starts in 2006.

Rolex Sports Car Series
Fogarty moved to the Rolex Sports Car Series in 2006, driving for GAINSCO/Bob Stallings Racing in the Daytona Prototype division. Teamed with Alex Gurney, the pairing combined for a series-record seven wins and ten poles in 2007, en route to the Daytona Prototype drivers' championship.

Fogarty and Gurney finished second in the championship standings in 2008, with one victory and eight top-five finishes. In 2009, they earned their second Daytona Prototype championship in a season that saw the number 99 GAINSCO Riley Pontiac score four victories and six pole positions.

In 2010, Fogarty finished third in the Daytona Prototype points standings with one win, while collecting two victories en route to a fourth-place finish in the championship standings with Gurney in 2011.

Fogarty and Gurney returned to GAINSCO/Bob Stallings Racing in 2012, with its Riley-Chevrolet sporting new Corvette-themed bodywork introduced by GM.

Racing record

SCCA National Championship Runoffs

American open–wheel racing results
(key) (Races in bold indicate pole position) (Races in italics indicate fastest lap)

Indy Lights

Atlantic Championship

Rolex Series
(key) (Races in bold indicate pole position)

Complete FIA World Endurance Championship results

* Season still in progress.

24 Hours of Le Mans results

WeatherTech SportsCar Championship results
(key)(Races in bold indicate pole position, Results are overall/class)

References

External links
 

1975 births
Living people
Sportspeople from Palo Alto, California
Racing drivers from California
24 Hours of Le Mans drivers
24 Hours of Daytona drivers
American Le Mans Series drivers
Atlantic Championship drivers
Rolex Sports Car Series drivers
Indy Lights drivers
Barber Pro Series drivers
WeatherTech SportsCar Championship drivers
FIA World Endurance Championship drivers
SCCA National Championship Runoffs participants
Extreme Speed Motorsports drivers
Rahal Letterman Lanigan Racing drivers
Action Express Racing drivers